James Fowler may refer to:

Politics
 James Fowler (Massachusetts politician) (1788–1873), American lawyer and politician
 James Fowler (Australian politician) (1863–1940), member of the Australian House of Representatives, 1901–1922
 James D. Fowler (born 1934), member of the Illinois House of Representatives

Other
 James Fowler (architect) (1828–1892), English ecclesiastical architect
 James Fowler (footballer) (born 1980), Scottish football player and manager
 James Alexander Fowler (1863–1955), American lawyer
 James Bonard Fowler (1933–2015), Alabama state trooper convicted of shooting unarmed civil rights protester Jimmie Lee Jackson
 James H. Fowler (born 1970), political science professor at the University of California, San Diego
 James Kingston Fowler (1852–1934), British physician
 James L. Fowler (1931–2015), Korean and Vietnam War veteran
 James W. Fowler (1940–2015), theology professor at Emory University
 Jim Fowler (1930–2019), American zoologist and television host

See also
 James Fowler High School, high school in Calgary